Crasilogia gressitti is a species of moth of the family Geometridae first described by Jeremy Daniel Holloway in 1984. It is found in Australia (including New South Wales and Queensland).

References

Moths described in 1984
Xanthorhoini